The John Souther House is a historic house at 43 Fairmont Street in Newton, Massachusetts.  The -story wood-frame house was built c. 1883 and is a well-preserved high style Queen Anne Victorian house.  Its basically rectangular shape is rendered distinctive by varied size and placement of gable dormers, projecting sections, a turret, and rounded wall sections.  Decoratively cut shingles are used to add texture to wall surfaces, the porch is ornately decorated.  The property includes a period carriage house.

The house was listed on the National Register of Historic Places in 1986.

See also
 National Register of Historic Places listings in Newton, Massachusetts

References

Houses on the National Register of Historic Places in Newton, Massachusetts
Queen Anne architecture in Massachusetts
Houses completed in 1883